Stochastic chains with memory of variable length are a family of stochastic chains of finite order in a finite alphabet, such as, for every time pass, only one finite suffix of the past, called context, is necessary to predict the next symbol. These models were introduced in the information theory literature by Jorma Rissanen in 1983, as a universal tool to data compression, but recently have been used to model data in different areas such as biology, linguistics and music.

Definition

A stochastic chain with memory of variable length is a stochastic chain , taking values in a finite alphabet , and characterized by a probabilistic context tree , so that

 is the group of all contexts. A context , being  the size of the context, is a finite portion of the past , which is relevant to predict the next symbol ;
 is a family of transition probabilities associated with each context.

History 

The class of stochastic chains with memory of variable length was introduced by Jorma Rissanen in the article A universal system for data compression system. Such class of stochastic chains was popularized in the statistical and probabilistic community by P. Bühlmann and A. J. Wyner in 1999, in the article Variable Length Markov Chains. Named by Bühlmann and Wyner as “variable length Markov chains” (VLMC),  these chains are also known as “variable-order Markov models" (VOM), “probabilistic suffix trees” and “context tree models”. The name “stochastic chains with memory of variable length” seems to have been introduced by Galves and Löcherbach, in 2008, in the article of the same name.

Examples

Interrupted light source

Consider a system by a lamp, an observer and a door between both of them. The lamp has two possible states: on, represented by 1, or off, represented by 0. When the lamp is on, the observer may see the light through the door, depending on which state the door is at the time: open, 1, or closed, 0. such states are independent of the original state of the lamp.

 

where . Define a new sequence  such that

  for every 

Using a context tree it's possible to represent the past states of the sequence, showing which are relevant to identify the next state.

Inferences in chains with variable length

Given a sample , one can find the appropriated context tree using the following algorithms.

The context algorithm

In the article A Universal Data Compression System, Rissanen introduced a consistent algorithm to estimate the probabilistic context tree that generates the data. This algorithm's function can be summarized in two steps:

 Given the sample produced by a chain with memory of variable length, we start with the maximum tree whose branches are all the candidates to contexts to the sample;
 The branches in this tree are then cut until you obtain the smallest tree that's well adapted to the data. Deciding whether or not shortening the context is done through a given gain function, such as the ratio of the log-likelihood.

Be  a sample of a finite probabilistic tree .

 

The intuitive reason for the choice of  comes from the impossibility of estimating the probabilities of sequence with lengths greater than  based in a sample of size .

From there, Rissanen shortens the maximum candidate through successive cutting the branches according to a sequence of tests based in statistical likelihood ratio. In a more formal definition, if bANnxk1b0 define the probability estimator of the transition probability  by

 

where . If , define .

To , define

 

where  and

 

The length of the current estimated context is defined by

 

where  is any positive constant. At last, by Rissanen, there's the following result. Given  of a finite probabilistic context tree , then

 

when .

Bayesian information criterion (BIC)

The estimator of the context tree by BIC with a penalty constant  is defined as

Smallest maximizer criterion (SMC)

The smallest maximizer criterion is calculated by selecting the smallest tree τ of a set of champion trees C such that

See also

Variable-order Markov model
Markov chain
Stochastic process

References

Stochastic models